Motorways of Pakistan are a network of multiple-lane, high-speed, controlled-access highways in Pakistan which are owned, maintained, and operated federally by Pakistan's National Highway Authority. At present, 2567 km of motorways are operational, while an additional 1191 km are under construction. Motorways are a part of Pakistan's “National Trade Corridor Project” and “China-Pakistan Belt Road Initiative,” from Khunjerab Pass near the Chinese border to Gwadar in Balochistan. There are a total of 16 motorways, 11 of which are operational, while some are under construction and others are planned.

All motorways in Pakistan are prefixed with the letter 'M' (for "Motorway") followed by the unique numerical designation of the specific highway (with a hyphen in the middle), e.g. "M-1".

History

Pakistan's motorways are an important part of Pakistan's "National Trade Corridor Project", which aims to link Pakistan's three Arabian Sea ports (Karachi Port, Port Bin Qasim and Gwadar Port) to the rest of the country through its national highways and motorways network and further north with Afghanistan, Central Asia and China. The project was planned in 1990. The China Pakistan Economic Corridor project aims to link Gwadar Port and Kashgar (China) using Pakistani motorways, national highways, and expressways.

List of motorways

Other proposed motorways

Map

Network map

Patrolling and enforcement

Pakistan's Motorways are patrolled by Pakistan's National Highways & Motorway Police (NH&MP), which is responsible for enforcement of traffic and safety laws, security and recovery on the Pakistan Motorway network. The NH&MP use SUVs, cars and heavy motorbikes for patrolling purposes and uses speed cameras for enforcing speed limits.

M-TAG

In 2016, NHA implemented electronic toll collection on M2 motorway in partnership with One Network that uses a RFID-based tag called the "M-TAG". The tag is attached to the windscreen of vehicles and is automatically scanned at toll plazas on entry and exit, meanwhile debiting the calculated toll tax from a prepaid M-TAG account. The service has since been expanded to all motorways, except M-14 and M-8, and is also used on Lahore Ring Road.

Emergency runways
The M-1 motorway (Peshawar-Islamabad) and the M-2 motorway (Islamabad-Lahore) each include two emergency runway sections of  length. The four emergency runway sections become operational by removing removable concrete medians using forklifts. The Pakistan Air Force (PAF) has used the M-2 motorway as a runway on two occasions: the first time in 2000 when it landed an F-7P fighter, a Super Mushak trainer and a C-130 and, again, in 2010. On the last occasion, the PAF used a runway section on the M-2 motorway on 2 April 2010 to land, refuel and take-off two jet fighters, a Mirage III and an F-7P, during its Highmark 2010 exercise.

See also

 National Highways of Pakistan
 Expressways of Pakistan
 Transport in Pakistan
 Speed limits in Pakistan
Belt and Road Initiative
National Highway Authority
Motorways in Pakistan

References

External links
 National Highway Authority
 Pakistan National Highways & Motorway Police

 01